

The Albatros L 65 was a German two-seat reconnaissance fighter biplane first flown in  1925.

Design and development
Under the Treaty of Versailles, military aircraft production was restricted in Germany, so Albatros Flugzeugwerke established a subsidiary to build the L 65 in Lithuania. This company was named Allgemeine Flug-Gesellschaft (A.F.G.) Memel, hence the L 65 was also known as the Memel A.F.G.1 (Memel being the German name for the city of Klaipeda).

The L 65 had a single-bay, staggered biplane configuration and was constructed of wood with a plywood skin. The wings were braced by interplane I-struts of broad aerofoil cross-section. Two prototypes were built, the first powered by a 340 kW (450 hp) water-cooled 12-cylinder "broad-arrow" Napier Lion engine; the second had its first flight in 1926 and had a 421 kW (565 hp) version of the Lion. The second prototype underwent evaluation by the Reichswehr to equip the clandestine training school at Lipetsk, but the Heinkel HD 17 was selected instead and no further aircraft were produced.

Specifications (L 65, second prototype)

References

 Green, W. & Swanborough, G. (1994). The Complete Book of Fighters. London: Salamander Books. 
 German Aircraft between 1919-1945

Biplanes
Single-engined tractor aircraft
1920s German military reconnaissance aircraft
L 065
AFG Memel aircraft
Aircraft first flown in 1925